Government High School Rampura Jawaharwala (Punjabi: ਸਰਕਾਰੀ ਹਾਈ ਸਕੂਲ ਰਾਮਪੁਰਾ ਜਵਾਹਰਵਾਲਾ) is a Co-Education School situated in the village Rampura Jawaharwala. It is located 5km south-east of Lehragaga in the District Sangrur district, Punjab. The school is run by the Department of Education of Punjab, part of the Government of Punjab, India. It was established in 1974 to provide education to the rural children of the village and neighboring areas. The school is affiliated with the Punjab School Education Board, Mohali.

References

External links
 
 ssapunjab.org

High schools and secondary schools in Punjab, India
Sangrur district